The Mark is a 2012 Christian film about the Rapture, directed by James Chankin and starring Craig Sheffer.

Plot
Chad Turner (Craig Sheffer) is implanted with a biometric computer chip (the Mark of the Beast). The Rapture occurs, and Joseph Pike (Gary Daniels) searches for Turner in hopes of gaining control of the Mark. Cooper (Eric Roberts), the security head of the company that created the chip, Avanti; is held hostage by Pike in order to locate Turner. Chad Turner must stay alive against all odds and keep the chip from falling into the wrong hands.

Cast
 Craig Sheffer as Chad Turner
 Gary Daniels as Joseph Pike
 Eric Roberts as Cooper
 Sonia Couling as Dao, Flight Attendant
 Byron Gibson as Jenson
 Art Supawatt Purdy as Jock

Sequel
A sequel titled The Mark 2: Redemption was released in 2013, taking place right after the ending of the first film. The plot follows the main cast from the first film right after the events of the last film, just as the Antichrist rises to power. The film features all of the original cast reprising their roles. The ending of the film hints for a sequel, but none has been confirmed as of yet.

References

External links
 
 

2012 films
2012 drama films
Films set in the future
Films about the rapture
Films set on airplanes
Films produced by Russell Wolfe
Films produced by David A. R. White
2010s English-language films